Real Situation Saturday was a Korean variety show shown on the SBS network. Many popular programs have aired on this Saturday line-up, including X-Man and Real Romance Love Letter, dominating Saturday evening ratings for a long time. It began to air for 60 mins. from November 8, 2003 to July 2, 2005, later expanded to 130 mins from July 9, 2005 to October 28, 2006, and cut back to 70 mins. from November 4, 2006 to  January 6, 2007 and ended its run because it suffered competition from Infinite Challenge.

Season 1 Segment

X-Man 
 Aired: November 8, 2003 - October 9, 2004 (Moved to Good Sunday)
 Starring: Kang Ho-dong, Yoo Jae-suk, Kim Je-dong

Real Situation Finding X-Man (Korean: 실제상황 X맨을 찾아라) was that program that began Real Situation Saturday. It later moved to Good Sunday to revive that line-up and to make way for Love Letter.

Season 2 Segments

Real Romance Love Letter 
 Aired: October 16, 2004 - October 28, 2006
 Seasons: 3
 Starring: Kang Ho-dong

Real Romance Love Letter (Korean: 리얼 로망스 연애편지) was a programme featuring male and female contestants competing for "each other".

Our Children Have Changed 
Aired: July 9, 2005 - October 28, 2006 (in Real Situation Saturday. Airs today as stand-alone program.)
Starring: Shin Dong-yup
Our Children Have Changed (Korean: 우리 아이가 달라졌어요) is a program about the difficulties of raising children. The predecessor is Shin Dong-yup's Love's Commissioned Mother.

Super Junior's Full House 
Aired: May 27, 2006 - August 12, 2006
Starring: Shin Dong-yup, Super Junior

Super Junior's Full House (Korean: 슈퍼주니어의 풀하우스) was a program where the group, Super Junior, would host 2 foreigners as they stayed in South Korea.

My Love, Monkey 
Aired: September 2, 2006 - October 28, 2006
Starring: Ayumi, Jung Jae-yong
My Love, Monkey (Korean: 내사랑 몽키) was a program about raising monkeys.

Season 3 Segment

Love Choice 
Aired: November 4, 2006 - January 6, 2007
Starring: Kim Yong-man
Love Choice (Korean: 선택남녀) was a program where male celebrities would attempt to date regular women. It was part of the short-lived 70 mins Real Situation Saturday and Good Sunday weekend.

External links 
 Real Situation Saturday Official Homepage 
 Love Choice Official Homepage 
 Our Children Have Changed Official Homepage 

Seoul Broadcasting System original programming
South Korean game shows
South Korean variety television shows
South Korean reality television series
2003 South Korean television series debuts